John Richardson (1679–1742) was a British colonial governor. He was Deputy Governor of Anguilla from 1735 until 1741.

References

https://www.findagrave.com/memorial/198676323/john-richardson

1679 births
1741 deaths
Deputy Governors of Anguilla